Jolanda van Dongen (born 30 August 1966 in Roosendaal) is a Dutch road racing cyclist. She became national time trial champion in 2003. She finished second at the national road championships in 1987.

References

External links

Living people
Dutch female cyclists
1966 births
Sportspeople from Roosendaal
Dutch cycling time trial champions
Cyclists from North Brabant